José Samyn (11 May 1946 – 28 August 1969) was a French professional road bicycle racer who died during a race in Zingem, Belgium.

Samyn was born in Quiévrain, Belgium to a Belgian mother and French father, he took French nationality in 1964 . As an amateur, he won the 1965 French Military Cycling Championship. In 1967, he won a stage of the Tour de France. The following year, however, a dope test carried out during the Tour proved positive. Samyn was expelled from the race, suspended for one month and fined.

He was the first winner of the GP Fayt-le-Franc, and after his death at Zingem the race was renamed Le Samyn (or Memorial Samyn) in his honor.

Major results

1967
Grand Prix de Denain
Solesmes
Tour de France:
Winner stage 11
1968
Circuit du Port de Dunkerque
GP Fayt-le-Franc
Wingene
1969
Tour de Picardie

References

External links 

Official Tour de France results for José Samyn

1946 births
1969 deaths
Cyclists who died while racing
French male cyclists
French Tour de France stage winners
Sport deaths in Belgium
Sportspeople from Nord (French department)
Belgian male cyclists
Cyclists from Hainaut (province)
Belgian people of French descent
Belgian emigrants to France
Cyclists from Hauts-de-France